Aarne Ihamo Salovaara (born Arne Ihamo Nylenius, 25 February 1887 – 11 September 1945) was a Finnish gymnast and track and field athlete, who competed in the 1908 and the 1912 Summer Olympics.

Athletics

Olympic Games

National 

He won two Finnish national championships in a combined sports competition Urheilukuninkuuskilpailut, which was held in 1902–1911:

Salovaara was a district secretary in the Finnish gymnastics and sport federation SVUL in 1906–1907 and a district chairman in 1910–1911, and a member of the board of SVUL in 1913 and 1926. He also was the chairman of his club, Kotkan Into, several times in 1915–1927.

Personal

Salovaara finnicized his name from Nylenius on 12 May 1906.

References

1887 births
1945 deaths
People from Kotka
People from Viipuri Province (Grand Duchy of Finland)
Finnish male artistic gymnasts
Finnish male discus throwers
Finnish male javelin throwers
Olympic gymnasts of Finland
Olympic silver medalists for Finland
Olympic bronze medalists for Finland
Olympic medalists in gymnastics
Gymnasts at the 1908 Summer Olympics
Gymnasts at the 1912 Summer Olympics
Olympic athletes of Finland
Athletes (track and field) at the 1908 Summer Olympics
Medalists at the 1912 Summer Olympics
Medalists at the 1908 Summer Olympics
Sportspeople from Kymenlaakso